The Self-Made Wife is a 1923 American silent melodrama film, directed by John Francis Dillon. It stars Ethel Grey Terry, Crauford Kent, and Virginia Ainsworth, and was released on July 8, 1923. It was written by Albert G. Kenyon based upon the short story "The Self-Made Wife" by Elizabeth Alexander.

Cast list
 Ethel Grey Terry as Corrie Godwin
 Crauford Kent as Tim Godwin
 Virginia Ainsworth as Dodo Sears
 Phillips Smalley as J. D. Sears
 Dorothy Cumming as Elena Vincent
 Maurice Murphy as Tim Godwin, Jr.
 Turner Savage as Jimmy Godwin
 Honora Beatrice as The baby
 Tom McGuire as Hotchkiss
 Laura La Varnie as Mrs. Satter
 Matthew Betz as Bob
 Frank Butler as Allerdyce

References

External links

Melodrama films
Films directed by John Francis Dillon
Universal Pictures films
American silent feature films
American black-and-white films
Silent American drama films
1923 drama films
1923 films
1920s American films